The Federal budget 2019–20 is the federal budget of Pakistan for the fiscal year beginning from 1 July 2019 and ending on 30 June 2020.

It was presented by Revenue Minister Hammad Azhar on 11 June 2019 at the National Assembly with a total outlay of ₨. 7.022 tn.

References 

Pakistani budgets
Imran Khan administration
Pakistan federal budget
Pakistan federal budget
federal budget
federal budget
2019 in Pakistani politics
2020 in Pakistani politics